Mikhail Valeryevich Shishkin (born 4 September 1980) is a former Russian professional footballer.

Club career
He played two seasons in the Russian Football National League for FC Metallurg Krasnoyarsk and FC Volgar-Gazprom Astrakhan.

References

External links
 

1980 births
Living people
Russian footballers
Association football defenders
Kazakhstan Premier League players
FC Zhenis Astana players
FC Volgar Astrakhan players
FC Lokomotiv Moscow players
FC Yenisey Krasnoyarsk players
FC Spartak Kostroma players
Expatriate footballers in Kazakhstan
Russian expatriate footballers
Russian expatriate sportspeople in Kazakhstan